Serbian–Montenegrin unionism is a political movement which arose after the break up of former Yugoslavia. It advocates Montenegro being in a political union with Serbia. The relationship between Serbs and ethnic Montenegrins is generally identified as being the most amicable of all the peoples of the former Yugoslavia. According to a 2011 national census, 178,110 Montenegrin citizens ethnically identify as Serb, with more than 4,000 identifying as "Serbian-Montenegrin" or "Montenegrin-Serbian".

History
Friendship between the states of Montenegro and Serbia is long-standing. In 19th century, Montenegro and Serbia were officially recognized as independent by the Ottoman Empire. The two entities since shared all essential experiences; they fought as part of the Balkan League when it came to ending the Ottoman presence in Rumelia during the First Balkan War, and they fought alongside each other against Austria-Hungary and Germany during World War I. Plans for unification, having predated the independence of the countries, were finally partially implemented after the war. The Podgorica Assembly (November 1918) concluded the decision to merge the Montenegro with the Serbia, followed by the creation of Yugoslavia. The Montenegrin monarchy was thereby removed, and opposition to the annexation culminated in the Christmas Uprising (1919) in which a part the Montenegrin population demonstrated against the Serbian takeover.

When Yugoslavia was reformed after World War II, Montenegro became a republic alongside a Serbian entity reduced in size. When in 1991 and 1992, the remaining outstanding Yugoslav republics voted for independence, Montenegro chose to continue a federation with Serbia as Yugoslavia ("Serbia and Montenegro" after 2003). After 1996, Montenegro – led by rebel and former pro-unionist Milo Đukanović – reversed its direction and began taking measures to distance itself internally from Serbia and discontinue its role within the federation. This sentiment, which grew popular among the Montenegrin nation, led to the 2006 independence referendum which ended in a majority vote for independence (55.5% of the vote, with the threshold for approval of independence set at a supermajority of 55%).

Political parties in Montenegro that support unionism

Parliamentary parties:
New Serb Democracy (national conservative, 9 MPs)
Democratic People's Party (populist, 5 MPs)
True Montenegro (factions, right-wing populist, 1 MP)
United Montenegro (factions, conservative, 1 MP)
Workers' Party (factions, syncretic, 1 MP)
Non-parliamentary:
Free Montenegro (right-wing populist)
Democratic Party of Unity (national conservative)
Democratic Serb Party (christian democratic)
Popular Movement (factions, populist/conservative)

Formerly:
Democratic Party of Socialists (1990–1997)
Socialist People's Party (1997–2006)
Defunct:
People's Party (1990–1998, 2001–2017)
Party of Serb Radicals (1991–2020)
Serb People's Party (1998–2009)
Yugoslav United Left in Montenegro (1994–2001)
People's Socialist Party (2001–2009)
Democratic Centre of Boka (2009–2014)
Serb List (Party) (2012–2020)

See also
Serbian nationalism
Yugoslavism
Montenegrin nationalism

References

Sources

Further reading

Political ideologies
Politics of Montenegro
Political organisations based in Montenegro
Politics of Serbia and Montenegro
Montenegro–Serbia relations
Kingdom of Montenegro
Kingdom of Serbia
Unionism
Political history of Serbia
Political history of Montenegro
Pan-Slavism